Cubleș may refer to:

Cubleș, a tributary of the Holod in Bihor County, Romania
Cubleșu, a village in the commune Cuzăplac, Sălaj County, Romania